The Eighth Army of the Ottoman Empire (Turkish: Sekizinci Ordu) was one of the field armies of the Ottoman Army. It was established during World War I.

World War I 

In June 1917, Enver Paşa activated the Yildirim Army Group (also known as Thunderbolt Army Group) commanded by the German General Erich von Falkenhayn, and reinforced it with surplus Ottoman units transferred from Galicia, Romania, and Thrace.

Following the formation of the Yildirim Army Group substantial forces were deployed to Syria and Palestine, where they continued to hold the Fourth Army defenses. Already in Palestine were the 3rd, 7th, 16th, and 54th Infantry Divisions while the 26th 27th, and 53rd Infantry Divisions arrived during the summer. The 3rd, 7th 16th, and 26th Infantry Divisions had fought in the Gallipoli campaign and the 3rd Cavalry Division had fought in the Caucasian Campaigns.

On 2 October 1917, he activated the new Eighth Army, commanded by Kress von Kressenstein, and deployed it along with the Seventh Army, commanded by Mustafa Kemal to the Yildirim Army Group. Seven infantry division and one cavalry division already serving in the region, formed the recently activated Ottoman Eighth Army. They were the 3rd, 7th, 16th, 26th, 27th, 53rd and 54th Infantry Divisions and the 3rd Cavalry Division.

Order of Battle, January 1918 
In January 1918, the army was structured as follows:

Eighth Army, (Ferik Cevat Pasha)
XXII Corps
3rd Division, 7th Division, 20th Division
16th Division
54th Division
2nd Caucasian Cavalry Division

Order of Battle, September 1918 

In September 1918, the army was structured as follows:

Eighth Army, (Ferik Cevat Pasha)
XXII Corps 
7th Division, 20th Division
Left Wing Group (Colonel Gustav von Oppen)
16th Division, 19th Division
German Asia Corps
2nd Caucasian Cavalry Division

After Mudros

Order of Battle, November 1918 
In November 1918, the army was structured as follows:

Eighth Army, (Smyrna)
XVII Corps
58th Division
XXI Corps 
57th Division

Sources

External links

Field armies of the Ottoman Empire
Military units and formations of the Ottoman Empire in World War I
History of Damascus